Kino's Journey —the Beautiful World— is an anime series based on the light novel series of the same name written by Keiichi Sigsawa and illustrated by Kohaku Kuroboshi. The series follows a traveler named Kino and her talking motorcycle, known as a Motorrad, named Hermes, as they explore countries with unique customs and people around a mysterious world, only spending three days at each location. Produced by A.C.G.T and Genco, and directed by Ryūtarō Nakamura, the 13-episode series aired weekly on the WOWOW satellite television network between April 8 and July 8, 2003. It was also broadcast on the anime satellite television network Animax, which also aired the series on its networks in Southeast Asia, East Asia, and South Asia. The episodes were released to Region 2 DVD compilation volumes between June 18 and November 19, 2003. Spanning six volumes, each volume contained two episodes except the first, which had three. The series was re-released in two, three volume bundles on January 19, 2005 and February 16, 2005. In addition to the main series, there is also a 12-minute-long prologue entitled "Episode 0: The Tower Country —Freelance—" which was released as an original video animation episode with the first animated film's DVD release on October 19, 2005.

The 13-episode anime series was licensed for North American distribution by ADV Films. The episodes were initially released on four DVD compilations between February 24 and June 29, 2004; the first volume contained four episodes, while each of the subsequent volumes contained three episodes. The first DVD volume was sold in two editions, with the difference between the two being a series box all four DVDs could fit inside. A DVD box set titled Kino's Journey: The Complete Collection was released on October 25, 2005 containing three discs.

Two pieces of theme music were used for the anime: one opening theme and one ending theme. The opening theme is "All the way"  by Mikuni Shimokawa and the ending theme is "the Beautiful World" by Ai Maeda; both singles were released on June 18, 2003. A new anime television series adaptation titled Kino's Journey —the Beautiful World— the Animated Series aired from October 6 to December 22, 2017. It is animated by Lerche and produced by Egg Firm. The series is directed by Tomohisa Taguchi, with Yukie Sugawara supervising scripts and Ryoko Amisaki designing the characters. Crunchyroll is streaming the anime with subtitles, and Funimation will stream the series with a simuldub.

Episode list

Kino's Journey —the Beautiful World— (2003)

Kino's Journey —the Beautiful World— the Animated Series (2017)

See also
List of Kino's Journey light novels

References

External links
Official website 
Kino's Journey at Anime Network

Kino's Journey